Swearing At Motorists is a two-piece rock and roll band composed of Dave Doughman (guitar, vocals, etc.) and drummer Martin Boeters (previously Joseph Siwinski). They formed in Dayton, Ohio in 1994, releasing their self-titled debut cassette in 1995. Joseph Siwinski replaced Don Thrasher (formerly of Guided by Voices), who had originally been on drums.

Critics have referred to Swearing At Motorists as “The Two Man Who”, a nickname bestowed upon the band by Cheetah Chrome of the Dead Boys. Their albums are a combination of rock and love songs that portray 'a character at the mercy of his own destiny'.

The Swearing At Motorists song "Flying Pizza", named after a Dayton pizzeria, details an unpleasant encounter with an old acquaintance.

Swearing At Motorists' concerts have involved antics such as Doughman tearing the strings out of his guitar mid-song and jumping offstage, as well as comedic anecdotes relayed between, and sometimes within, songs.

The band has toured the United States and Europe several times. From 2000 - 2011 all of their records were released by Bloomington, Indiana label Secretly Canadian. In 2014 Austrian label Siluh Records released their 7" ep Burn Down The Wire. On February 8, 2014, the band successfully funded the production & manufacturing of their newest album, While Laughing, The Joker Tells The Truth, via Kickstarter.

Frontman Dave Doughman has challenged The White Stripes to a contest of who can put on a better show, but has never received a reply.

Discography

 Swearing At Motorists (CD) - 1995
 Tuesday's Pretzel Night (EP) - 1996
 The Fear of Low-Flying Clouds (LP) - 1997
 Enough Drama and The Way Things Are (EP) - 1997
 More Songs From the Mellow Struggle (CD) - 2000
 Stumble to the Zero Hour (EP) - 2000
 Number Seven Uptown (LP) - 2000
 The Burnt Orange Heresy (EP) - 2000
 Along the Inclined Plane (EP) - 2002
 This Flag Signals Goodbye (LP) - 2002
 Last Night Becomes This Morning (LP) - 2006
 Exile on Gipsstraße (LP) - 2006
 Postcards From A Drinking Town (collected singles '96-'02) (LP) - 2011
 Burn Down The Wire (EP) - 2014
 While Laughing, The Joker Tells The Truth (LP) - 2014

References

External links

Swearing At Motorists (on Secretly Canadian)

Musical groups from Dayton, Ohio
Musical groups established in 1995
Rock music duos
Secretly Canadian artists